The 2019 San Diego Toreros football team represents the University of San Diego during the 2019 NCAA Division I FCS football season. They are led by seventh-year head coach Dale Lindsey and play their home games at Torero Stadium. They are a member of the Pioneer Football League (PFL).

Previous season 
The Toreros finished the 2018 season 9–3, 8–0 in PFL play to be PFL champions. They earned the PFL's automatic bid to the FCS Playoffs where they lost in the first round to Nicholls.

Preseason

Preseason coaches' poll
The Pioneer League released their preseason coaches' poll on July 30, 2019. The Toreros were picked to finish in first place.

Preseason All–PFL teams
The Toreros had thirteen players selected to the preseason all–PFL teams.

Offense

First team

Anthony Lawrence – QB

Michael Bandy – WR

Dan Cooney – OL

Jake Michaels – OL

Second team

Emilio Martinez – RB

Aidan Valencia – OL

Defense

First team

Nick Friedel – DL

Second team

Connor Spencer – DL

Kama Kamaka – LB

Kim Mahoney – LB

Arrion Archie – DB

Special teams

First team

Michael Armstead – RS

Second team

Tanner Kuljian – P

Schedule

'''

Game summaries

at Cal Poly

UC Davis

Harvard

Marist

at Davidson

Valparaiso

at Dayton

Drake

at Stetson

Morehead State

at Jacksonville

FCS Playoffs
The Toreros received an automatic bid (due to winning their conference) for the postseason tournament, with a first-round pairing against Northern Iowa.

at Northern Iowa–First Round

Ranking movements

References

San Diego
San Diego Toreros football seasons
Pioneer Football League champion seasons
San Diego
San Diego Toreros football